Devathura Falls (or formally Thevathura Falls) (Sinhala: දේවතුර දියඇල්ල) is a waterfall in Nuwara Eliya District of Sri Lanka. The water cascades three falls and the lowest part is close to the road at the "ramboda pass", and is approximately 10 meter in height. However, the upper part of waterfall is situated little above the road and is approximately 72 feet in height.

See also
 List of waterfalls of Sri Lanka

References

External links 
 YouTube Video

Landforms of Nuwara Eliya District
Landforms of Central Province, Sri Lanka
Tourist attractions in Central Province, Sri Lanka
Waterfalls in Central Province, Sri Lanka